The Braille pattern dots-13456 is a 6-dot braille cell with both top, the middle right, and both bottom dots raised, or an 8-dot braille cell with both top, the upper-middle right, and both lower-middle dots raised. It is represented by the Unicode code point U+283d, and in Braille ASCII with Y.

Unified Braille

In unified international braille, the braille pattern dots-13456 is used to represent a palatal approximant or near-close near-front vowel, such as /j/ or /ʏ/, or otherwise as needed.

Table of unified braille values

Other braille

Plus dots 7 and 8

Related to Braille pattern dots-13456 are Braille patterns 134567, 134568, and 1345678, which are used in 8-dot braille systems, such as Gardner-Salinas and Luxembourgish Braille.

Related 8-dot kantenji patterns

In the Japanese kantenji braille, the standard 8-dot Braille patterns 25678, 125678, 245678, and 1245678 are the patterns related to Braille pattern dots-13456, since the two additional dots of kantenji patterns 013456, 134567, and 0134567 are placed above the base 6-dot cell, instead of below, as in standard 8-dot braille.

Kantenji using braille patterns 25678, 125678, 245678, or 1245678

This listing includes kantenji using Braille pattern dots-13456 for all 6349 kanji found in JIS C 6226-1978.

  - 車

Variants and thematic compounds

  -  selector 2 + む/車  =  厶
  -  selector 3 + む/車  =  冓
  -  selector 4 + む/車  =  蜀
  -  selector 5 + む/車  =  牟
  -  selector 6 + む/車  =  矣
  -  む/車 + selector 1  =  虫
  -  む/車 + selector 2  =  羽
  -  む/車 + selector 5  =  虱
  -  む/車 + 宿  =  風

Compounds of 車

  -  よ/广 + む/車  =  庫
  -  て/扌 + む/車  =  揮
  -  日 + む/車  =  暫
  -  ち/竹 + む/車  =  範
  -  ね/示 + む/車  =  褌
  -  宿 + む/車  =  軍
  -  龸 + む/車  =  輝
  -  は/辶 + む/車  =  運
  -  日 + 龸 + む/車  =  暉
  -  日 + 宿 + む/車  =  暈
  -  に/氵 + 宿 + む/車  =  渾
  -  へ/⺩ + 宿 + む/車  =  琿
  -  ひ/辶 + 宿 + む/車  =  皹
  -  く/艹 + 宿 + む/車  =  葷
  -  え/訁 + 宿 + む/車  =  諢
  -  み/耳 + む/車  =  載
  -  火 + む/車  =  輩
  -  ひ/辶 + む/車  =  連
  -  れ/口 + ひ/辶 + む/車  =  嗹
  -  に/氵 + ひ/辶 + む/車  =  漣
  -  い/糹/#2 + ひ/辶 + む/車  =  縺
  -  か/金 + ひ/辶 + む/車  =  鏈
  -  さ/阝 + む/車  =  陣
  -  む/車 + の/禾  =  撃
  -  む/車 + を/貝  =  斬
  -  つ/土 + む/車 + を/貝  =  塹
  -  や/疒 + む/車 + を/貝  =  嶄
  -  る/忄 + む/車 + を/貝  =  慙
  -  き/木 + む/車 + を/貝  =  槧
  -  か/金 + む/車 + を/貝  =  鏨
  -  む/車 + ゐ/幺  =  繋
  -  む/車 + お/頁  =  軌
  -  む/車 + か/金  =  軒
  -  む/車 + ん/止  =  軟
  -  む/車 + て/扌  =  転
  -  む/車 + む/車 + て/扌  =  轉
  -  れ/口 + む/車 + て/扌  =  囀
  -  む/車 + た/⽥  =  軸
  -  む/車 + け/犬  =  軽
  -  む/車 + む/車 + け/犬  =  輕
  -  む/車 + ち/竹  =  較
  -  む/車 + る/忄  =  輪
  -  む/車 + み/耳  =  輯
  -  む/車 + ゆ/彳  =  輸
  -  む/車 + す/発  =  輹
  -  む/車 + ふ/女  =  輻
  -  む/車 + へ/⺩  =  轄
  -  む/車 + ら/月  =  轍
  -  む/車 + う/宀/#3  =  轟
  -  selector 4 + む/車 + う/宀/#3  =  軣
  -  な/亻 + 宿 + む/車  =  俥
  -  る/忄 + 龸 + む/車  =  慚
  -  む/車 + 宿 + を/貝  =  軋
  -  む/車 + よ/广 + さ/阝  =  軛
  -  む/車 + 龸 + う/宀/#3  =  軫
  -  む/車 + 比 + か/金  =  軻
  -  む/車 + selector 6 + け/犬  =  軼
  -  む/車 + 囗 + selector 2  =  軾
  -  む/車 + す/発 + れ/口  =  輅
  -  む/車 + 宿 + ゆ/彳  =  輊
  -  む/車 + う/宀/#3 + ち/竹  =  輌
  -  む/車 + 宿 + み/耳  =  輒
  -  む/車 + 宿 + 宿  =  輓
  -  む/車 + 宿 + ほ/方  =  輔
  -  む/車 + み/耳 + ゑ/訁  =  輙
  -  む/車 + ち/竹 + selector 4  =  輛
  -  む/車 + ら/月 + た/⽥  =  輜
  -  む/車 + 宿 + ゑ/訁  =  輟
  -  む/車 + selector 3 + け/犬  =  輦
  -  む/車 + け/犬 + け/犬  =  輳
  -  む/車 + と/戸 + と/戸  =  輾
  -  む/車 + 宿 + 囗  =  輿
  -  む/車 + 龸 + の/禾  =  轂
  -  む/車 + 宿 + え/訁  =  轅
  -  む/車 + そ/馬 + 比  =  轆
  -  む/車 + ち/竹 + 
せ/食  =  轌
  -  む/車 + う/宀/#3 + の/禾  =  轎
  -  む/車 + ひ/辶 + 心  =  轗
  -  む/車 + 宿 + ち/竹  =  轜
  -  む/車 + 宿 + れ/口  =  轡
  -  む/車 + 日 + ゐ/幺  =  轢
  -  む/車 + こ/子 + ん/止  =  轣
  -  む/車 + 宿 + た/⽥  =  轤

Compounds of 厶

  -  な/亻 + む/車  =  俊
  -  も/門 + む/車  =  勾
  -  る/忄 + む/車  =  悛
  -  む/車 + と/戸  =  弁
  -  む/車 + む/車 + と/戸  =  辨
  -  selector 4 + む/車 + と/戸  =  辧
  -  む/車 + 宿 + ゐ/幺  =  辮
  -  む/車 + 龸 + と/戸  =  辯
  -  む/車 + 心 + つ/土  =  瓣
  -  や/疒 + む/車 + と/戸  =  峅
  -  ち/竹 + selector 2 + む/車  =  簒
  -  む/車 + 宿 + 龸  =  允
  -  れ/口 + 宿 + む/車  =  吮
  -  ゆ/彳 + 宿 + む/車  =  弘

Compounds of 冓

  -  き/木 + む/車  =  構
  -  に/氵 + む/車  =  溝
  -  ゑ/訁 + む/車  =  講
  -  を/貝 + む/車  =  購
  -  ひ/辶 + selector 3 + む/車  =  遘
  -  ふ/女 + 宿 + む/車  =  媾
  -  て/扌 + 龸 + む/車  =  搆
  -  め/目 + 宿 + む/車  =  覯
  -  ち/竹 + 宿 + む/車  =  篝

Compounds of 蜀

  -  氷/氵 + む/車  =  濁
  -  み/耳 + selector 4 + む/車  =  躅
  -  む/車 + か/金 + ら/月  =  髑
  -  火 + 宿 + む/車  =  燭

Compounds of 牟

  -  か/金 + む/車  =  鉾
  -  き/木 + selector 5 + む/車  =  桙
  -  め/目 + selector 5 + む/車  =  眸
  -  む/車 + 龸 + せ/食  =  鴾

Compounds of 矣

  -  つ/土 + む/車  =  埃
  -  む/車 + や/疒  =  挨
  -  な/亻 + selector 6 + む/車  =  俟
  -  ん/止 + selector 6 + む/車  =  欸
  -  ま/石 + selector 6 + む/車  =  竢
  -  や/疒 + う/宀/#3 + む/車  =  峻
  -  き/木 + 宿 + む/車  =  梭
  -  に/氵 + 龸 + む/車  =  浚
  -  む/車 + selector 4 + ひ/辶  =  皴
  -  ま/石 + 宿 + む/車  =  竣
  -  ひ/辶 + う/宀/#3 + む/車  =  逡
  -  そ/馬 + 宿 + む/車  =  駿

Compounds of 虫

  -  む/車 + む/車 + む/車  =  蟲
  -  ゆ/彳 + む/車  =  強
  -  い/糹/#2 + ゆ/彳 + む/車  =  繦
  -  ね/示 + ゆ/彳 + む/車  =  襁
  -  け/犬 + む/車  =  独
  -  け/犬 + け/犬 + む/車  =  獨
  -  い/糹/#2 + む/車  =  繭
  -  む/車 + む/車  =  蚕
  -  え/訁 + む/車  =  蛮
  -  え/訁 + え/訁 + む/車  =  蠻
  -  ほ/方 + む/車  =  蜂
  -  う/宀/#3 + む/車  =  蜜
  -  心 + う/宀/#3 + む/車  =  櫁
  -  せ/食 + む/車  =  蝕
  -  れ/口 + む/車  =  融
  -  囗 + む/車  =  触
  -  囗 + 囗 + む/車  =  觸
  -  そ/馬 + む/車  =  騒
  -  そ/馬 + そ/馬 + む/車  =  騷
  -  む/車 + 龸  =  蚊
  -  む/車 + ゑ/訁  =  蚤
  -  む/車 + ひ/辶  =  蛇
  -  む/車 + つ/土  =  蛙
  -  む/車 + ⺼  =  蛸
  -  む/車 + 囗  =  蛾
  -  む/車 + れ/口  =  蝉
  -  む/車 + ろ/十  =  蝋
  -  む/車 + よ/广  =  蝶
  -  む/車 + め/目  =  蝿
  -  む/車 + そ/馬  =  蟻
  -  む/車 + ぬ/力  =  蠢
  -  む/車 + い/糹/#2  =  雖
  -  れ/口 + む/車 + selector 1  =  嗤
  -  は/辶 + む/車 + selector 1  =  蜑
  -  て/扌 + 宿 + む/車  =  掻
  -  む/車 + selector 5 + ほ/方  =  虻
  -  む/車 + 囗 + 仁/亻  =  蚋
  -  む/車 + け/犬 + ほ/方  =  蚌
  -  む/車 + ゆ/彳 + selector 4  =  蚓
  -  む/車 + selector 6 + こ/子  =  蚣
  -  む/車 + 宿 + や/疒  =  蚩
  -  む/車 + 比 + と/戸  =  蚪
  -  む/車 + も/門 + selector 2  =  蚫
  -  む/車 + く/艹 + selector 4  =  蚯
  -  む/車 + た/⽥ + selector 4  =  蚰
  -  む/車 + selector 4 + る/忄  =  蚶
  -  む/車 + れ/口 + ろ/十  =  蛄
  -  む/車 + selector 5 + そ/馬  =  蛆
  -  む/車 + 仁/亻 + ろ/十  =  蛉
  -  む/車 + 数 + ま/石  =  蛎
  -  む/車 + 囗 + れ/口  =  蛔
  -  む/車 + selector 5 + か/金  =  蛛
  -  む/車 + れ/口 + せ/食  =  蛞
  -  む/車 + 龸 + ち/竹  =  蛟
  -  む/車 + り/分 + 囗  =  蛤
  -  む/車 + 龸 + 龸  =  蛩
  -  む/車 + selector 4 + こ/子  =  蛬
  -  む/車 + selector 4 + ゆ/彳  =  蛭
  -  む/車 + と/戸 + selector 2  =  蛯
  -  む/車 + 囗 + selector 3  =  蛹
  -  む/車 + 龸 + 宿  =  蛻
  -  む/車 + 宿 + ろ/十  =  蜃
  -  む/車 + め/目 + 宿  =  蜆
  -  む/車 + selector 5 + こ/子  =  蜈
  -  む/車 + 氷/氵 + う/宀/#3  =  蜉
  -  む/車 + の/禾 + ぬ/力  =  蜊
  -  む/車 + り/分 + も/門  =  蜍
  -  む/車 + は/辶 + selector 1  =  蜒
  -  む/車 + や/疒 + れ/口  =  蜘
  -  む/車 + selector 4 + 火  =  蜚
  -  む/車 + き/木 + お/頁  =  蜥
  -  む/車 + 囗 + つ/土  =  蜩
  -  む/車 + 日 + 数  =  蜴
  -  む/車 + け/犬 + さ/阝  =  蜷
  -  む/車 + し/巿 + せ/食  =  蜻
  -  む/車 + 宿 + う/宀/#3  =  蜿
  -  む/車 + の/禾 + と/戸  =  蝌
  -  む/車 + 宿 + 氷/氵  =  蝎
  -  む/車 + selector 5 + ゆ/彳  =  蝓
  -  む/車 + 龸 + へ/⺩  =  蝗
  -  む/車 + 宿 + へ/⺩  =  蝙
  -  む/車 + た/⽥ + ⺼  =  蝟
  -  む/車 + 宿 + ふ/女  =  蝠
  -  む/車 + は/辶 + selector 3  =  蝣
  -  む/車 + 宿 + の/禾  =  蝦
  -  む/車 + selector 6 + ろ/十  =  蝨
  -  む/車 + 宿 + 数  =  蝪
  -  む/車 + 宿 + す/発  =  蝮
  -  む/車 + selector 6 + ら/月  =  蝴
  -  む/車 + 宿 + か/金  =  蝸
  -  む/車 + や/疒 + さ/阝  =  螂
  -  む/車 + 龸 + 日  =  螟
  -  む/車 + か/金 + 氷/氵  =  螫
  -  む/車 + selector 3 + ほ/方  =  螯
  -  む/車 + 龸 + つ/土  =  螳
  -  む/車 + た/⽥ + ゐ/幺  =  螺
  -  む/車 + 宿 + る/忄  =  螻
  -  む/車 + す/発 + selector 1  =  螽
  -  む/車 + 龸 + ろ/十  =  蟀
  -  む/車 + つ/土 + お/頁  =  蟄
  -  む/車 + selector 6 + く/艹  =  蟆
  -  む/車 + 宿 + く/艹  =  蟇
  -  む/車 + 宿 + 心  =  蟋
  -  む/車 + 龸 + し/巿  =  蟐
  -  む/車 + 宿 + と/戸  =  蟒
  -  む/車 + の/禾 + た/⽥  =  蟠
  -  む/車 + 宿 + つ/土  =  蟯
  -  む/車 + み/耳 + へ/⺩  =  蟶
  -  む/車 + 龸 + ふ/女  =  蟷
  -  む/車 + 囗 + そ/馬  =  蟹
  -  む/車 + 宿 + 日  =  蟾
  -  む/車 + 宿 + め/目  =  蠅
  -  む/車 + ん/止 + selector 1  =  蠍
  -  む/車 + け/犬 + と/戸  =  蠎
  -  む/車 + 龸 + 囗  =  蠏
  -  む/車 + 龸 + き/木  =  蠑
  -  む/車 + ち/竹 + の/禾  =  蠕
  -  む/車 + 龸 + く/艹  =  蠖
  -  む/車 + 宿 + そ/馬  =  蠡
  -  む/車 + 宿 + よ/广  =  蠣
  -  む/車 + 宿 + ま/石  =  蠧
  -  む/車 + 宿 + ⺼  =  蠱
  -  む/車 + 宿 + む/車  =  蠶
  -  む/車 + 龸 + ま/石  =  蠹

Compounds of 羽

  -  と/戸 + む/車  =  扇
  -  火 + と/戸 + む/車  =  煽
  -  こ/子 + む/車  =  翁
  -  く/艹 + こ/子 + む/車  =  蓊
  -  ろ/十 + む/車  =  翰
  -  に/氵 + ろ/十 + む/車  =  瀚
  -  た/⽥ + む/車  =  翻
  -  た/⽥ + た/⽥ + む/車  =  飜
  -  ⺼ + む/車  =  膠
  -  む/車 + ま/石  =  翌
  -  む/車 + 日  =  習
  -  る/忄 + む/車 + 日  =  慴
  -  て/扌 + む/車 + 日  =  摺
  -  ね/示 + む/車 + 日  =  褶
  -  む/車 + こ/子  =  翼
  -  ぬ/力 + む/車 + selector 2  =  勠
  -  よ/广 + む/車 + selector 2  =  廖
  -  て/扌 + む/車 + selector 2  =  挧
  -  き/木 + む/車 + selector 2  =  榻
  -  い/糹/#2 + む/車 + selector 2  =  繆
  -  は/辶 + む/車 + selector 2  =  翅
  -  ま/石 + む/車 + selector 2  =  翊
  -  そ/馬 + む/車 + selector 2  =  翔
  -  り/分 + む/車 + selector 2  =  翕
  -  火 + む/車 + selector 2  =  翡
  -  へ/⺩ + む/車 + selector 2  =  翩
  -  も/門 + む/車 + selector 2  =  翳
  -  つ/土 + む/車 + selector 2  =  翹
  -  心 + む/車 + selector 2  =  蓼
  -  え/訁 + む/車 + selector 2  =  謬
  -  せ/食 + む/車 + selector 2  =  醪
  -  か/金 + む/車 + selector 2  =  鏐
  -  む/車 + selector 4 + 囗  =  戮
  -  心 + 龸 + む/車  =  栩
  -  き/木 + 龸 + む/車  =  樛
  -  む/車 + 宿 + お/頁  =  翆
  -  む/車 + お/頁 + ろ/十  =  翠
  -  む/車 + ら/月 + ぬ/力  =  翦
  -  む/車 + selector 1 + 宿  =  翫

Compounds of 虱 and 風

  -  や/疒 + む/車  =  嵐
  -  心 + む/車  =  楓
  -  む/車 + な/亻  =  颱
  -  や/疒 + む/車 + 宿  =  瘋
  -  え/訁 + む/車 + 宿  =  諷
  -  龸 + む/車 + 宿  =  颪
  -  ま/石 + む/車 + 宿  =  颯
  -  む/車 + 宿 + に/氵  =  飃
  -  む/車 + 宿 + け/犬  =  飆
  -  む/車 + を/貝 + selector 5  =  颶
  -  む/車 + に/氵 + ね/示  =  飄

Other compounds

  -  ん/止 + む/車  =  凪
  -  む/車 + し/巿  =  凧
  -  な/亻 + む/車 + し/巿  =  佩
  -  へ/⺩ + む/車 + し/巿  =  珮
  -  き/木 + む/車 + 宿  =  凩
  -  む/車 + 日 + へ/⺩  =  凰
  -  む/車 + 宿 + せ/食  =  鳳
  -  む/車 + 心  =  恵
  -  む/車 + む/車 + 心  =  惠
  -  の/禾 + む/車  =  穂
  -  の/禾 + の/禾 + む/車  =  穗
  -  む/車 + 氷/氵  =  敷
  -  む/車 + 火  =  無
  -  れ/口 + む/車 + 火  =  嘸
  -  よ/广 + む/車 + 火  =  廡
  -  る/忄 + む/車 + 火  =  憮
  -  て/扌 + む/車 + 火  =  撫
  -  心 + む/車 + 火  =  蕪
  -  む/車 + ほ/方  =  舞
  -  め/目 + む/車  =  睦
  -  し/巿 + む/車  =  紫
  -  む/車 + そ/馬 + selector 2  =  恙
  -  ひ/辶 + 龸 + む/車  =  逵
  -  に/氵 + う/宀/#3 + む/車  =  淕

Notes

Braille patterns